Josep Maria Beal i Benedico (died 23 November 2019) was an Andorran politician who served as General Syndic (Speaker) of the General Council since 12 January 1990 until 15 February 1991, when he resigned suffering from a disease that would end up confining him to a wheelchair. He abandoned the first line of politics until 2003, when he was candidate in the 2003 local elections but unsuccessfully.

Between 1984 and 1989 he served as Cònsol Major (Mayor) of Escaldes-Engordany and promoted one of the best known spas in the world Caldea.

He was considered one of the most important and key figures as one of the promotors of the constituent process that ended with the approval of the Constitution in 1993. His last public appearance was in the acts of celebration of the 25 years of the Constitution in March 2018.

Beal died on 23 November 2019 at the age of 77. His death shocked Andorran politics and his funeral, held on 25 November, was attended by the Prime Minister Xavier Espot and the current General Syndic Roser Suñé Pascuet among other important representatives.

References

Date of birth missing
2019 deaths
Andorran politicians
People from Escaldes-Engordany
General Syndics of the General Council (Andorra)
Members of the General Council (Andorra)
20th-century politicians
Year of birth missing